Paul McKee, Jr. is a St. Louis, Missouri-area property developer. McKee's property management and development company, M Property Services, formerly McEagle Properties, is based in O'Fallon, Missouri.

McKee grew up in the suburb of Overland, Missouri and attended Chaminade College Preparatory School. He has a civil engineering degree from Washington University in St. Louis and is a registered professional engineer in Missouri, Indiana, Iowa and Illinois. He is married to Marguerite "Midge" McKee and the two have four children and 15 grandchildren. They live in the suburb of Chesterfield, Missouri.

McKee's co-founded the construction firm Paric Corp. in 1979. He is a founding member of the board and former chairman of BJC HealthCare, the area's largest employer. He has donated tens of thousands of dollars to politicians of both political parties. McKee says that he favors neither party particularly strongly, but "follow[s] the business agenda". McKee was the primary organizer of a bipartisan trade mission to People's Republic of China to stimulate trade between that country and businesses in the region, with a particular focus on using the underutilized Lambert-St. Louis International Airport as a cargo stopover from China to South America.

Since its inception in 1990, M Property Services has provided development assistance for over 3,600 acres and over 3.5 million square feet of commercial and residential space. Specializing in large-scale, mixed-use developments, M Property Services and its affiliates have owned or developed and sold office buildings, industrial facilities, retail centers and sites throughout the St. Louis metropolitan region and surrounding states.

Major developments

Some of McKee's major developments include WingHaven, a  mixed-use project that is the corporate home to MasterCard Operations Center in O'Fallon, MO; NorthPark, a joint venture with Clayco Realty Group including  of planned commercial and industrial redevelopment in North St. Louis County that is the corporate home to Express Scripts; and Hazelwood Commerce Center, a  industrial park in Hazelwood, Missouri.

McKee's envisioned NorthSide Regeneration Project in the Old North Saint Louis, JeffVanDerLou and Saint Louis Place neighborhoods was initially referred to as Blairmont, in reference to one of the shell companies used to acquire lots and buildings in the three neighborhoods.

NorthSide was intended to revitalize North St. Louis. However, according to St. Louis Public Radio, "Nearly a decade after Paul McKee sold St. Louis on a vision worth billions to rehab more than 150 properties on the city’s north side, roofs have caved, walls have crumbled and residents have lost patience — and hope." In addition, the state of Missouri sued NorthSide Regeneration for tax credit fraud, alleging that NorthSide kept $4.5 million in tax credits for redevelopment projects despite not completing many of the purchases. The suit was settled in 2019.

McKee asked the City of St. Louis for $409,917,496 in tax increment financing to get the project off the ground.

The National Geospatial-Intelligence Agency (NGA) West Headquarters has committed to building a $1.7 billion campus on a 100-acre site within the development that would support 7,200 jobs with an average salary of approximately $95,000.

References

External links
 McEagle Properties - McKee's property development company
  Built St. Louis - Web Log 
 Facts About Paul McKee’s North Side Properties 

Year of birth missing (living people)
Living people
American real estate businesspeople
Businesspeople from St. Louis
People from St. Louis County, Missouri
Chaminade College Preparatory School (Missouri) alumni
McKelvey School of Engineering alumni